Muhammad, The Messenger of God is a book about Islam written by Betty Kelen. See also identity of first male Muslim.

External links
Description of the book

Non-Islamic Islam studies literature